Anne Simpson is a Canadian poet, novelist, artist and essayist. She was a recipient of the Griffin Poetry Prize.

Biography
Simpson received her B.A. and M.A. degrees from Queen's University, and graduated in Fine Arts from OCAD University (formerly the Ontario College of Art). Subsequently, she worked as a CUSO volunteer English teacher for two years in Nigeria. She is an adjunct professor at St. Francis Xavier University, where she established the Writing Centre.

Simpson was the co-winner of the 1997 Journey Prize, awarded for her short story Dreaming Snow.  Her second collection of poetry, Loop (McClelland & Stewart, 2003), was the winner of the 2004 Canadian Griffin Poetry Prize. Loop contains many poems composed in sequences, including, notably, a poetic demonstration of a Möbius strip.

Her other poetry collections include Light Falls Through You (McClelland & Stewart, 2000), winner of the Gerald Lampert Award and the Atlantic Poetry Prize,  Quick (McClelland & Stewart, 2007), winner of the Pat Lowther Award, and Is (McClelland & Stewart, 2011) in which Simpson 'negotiates an ever-changing path between language and structure'.

Simpson has written three novels: Speechless (Freehand, 2020), Canterbury Beach (Penguin, 2001) and Falling (McClelland & Stewart, 2008), which was a Canadian bestseller and winner of the Dartmouth Fiction Award. It was long-listed for the International Dublin Literary Award.

She has also written a book of essays on poetics, The Marram Grass: Poetry and Otherness (Gaspereau, 2009).

Simpson has been the writer-in-residence at a number of institutions, including the University of New Brunswick, the Medical Humanities Program at Dalhousie University, the Saskatoon Public Library, the University of Prince Edward Island, Dalhousie University, and Memorial University. She has been a faculty member at Sage Hill Writing Experience and the Banff Centre.

Bibliography 
Poetry
Light Falls Through You – 2000 (winner of the Gerald Lampert Award and the Atlantic Poetry Prize) 
Loop – 2003 (shortlisted for the 2003 Governor General's Award, winner of the 2004 Canadian Griffin Poetry Prize) 
Quick – 2007  (winner of the 2008 Pat Lowther Award)
Is – 2011 

Novels
Canterbury Beach – 2001 (shortlisted for the Thomas Head Raddall Award) 
Falling – 2008  
Speechless – 2020  

Essays
A Ragged Pen: Essays on Poetry & Memory – 2006 Gaspereau Press 
The Marram Grass: Poetry & Otherness – 2009 Gaspereau Press  
Experiments in Distant Influence – 2020 Gaspereau Press

References

External links 

Griffin Poetry Prize biography, poetry reading extract and citation
Seven small poems 2003– Arts & Opinion Vol 2 no 4 
Example of Simpson's poetry- 'Orpheus afterwards'
Examples of Simpson's Art
Simpson writing website
Writer's Federation of Nova Scotia Biography

1956 births
Living people
20th-century Canadian poets
21st-century Canadian novelists
21st-century Canadian poets
Queen's University at Kingston alumni
Canadian women novelists
Canadian women poets
Canadian women essayists
20th-century Canadian women writers
21st-century Canadian women writers
20th-century Canadian essayists
21st-century Canadian essayists